Millerville can refer to a location in the United States:

 Millerville, Alabama
 Millerville, California, former name of Millersville, California
 Millerville, Minnesota
 Millerville Township, Douglas County, Minnesota